Terbos was a town of ancient Bithynia, inhabited during Roman times.

Its site is located near Akçakaya in Asiatic Turkey.

References

Populated places in Bithynia
Former populated places in Turkey
History of Sakarya Province